Barnes Common is common land in the south east of Barnes, London, England, adjoining Putney Lower Common to the east and bounded to the south by the Upper Richmond Road. It is also a Local Nature Reserve. Facilities include a full-size football pitch and a nature trail.

The common is made up of mixed broadleaf woodland, scrubland and acid grassland and is generally flat. It is owned by the Dean and Chapter of St Paul's Cathedral, acting through the Church Commissioners, and managed by the London Borough of Richmond upon Thames, advised and assisted by the charity Barnes Common Limited (previously known as Friends of Barnes Common).

Mill Hill is effectively an enclave of eleven large houses surrounded by the Common, three of which are listed buildings.

Transport
Barnes railway station is just within the common. The common is served by London Buses routes 33, 72, 265 and 485.

History
Singer and rock musician Marc Bolan died on the common on 16 September 1977 when the car he was being driven in crashed into a tree, at what is now Marc Bolan's Rock Shrine.

In August 1736 the common hosted a cricket match between Surrey and London. This is the only time that a reference to the common is found in surviving cricket records.

References

External links
 London Borough of Richmond upon Thames: Barnes Common Management Plan 2009-14
 Barnes Common Limited
 

1736 establishments in England
Barnes, London
Common land in London
Cricket grounds in Surrey
Cricket in Surrey
Defunct cricket grounds in England
Defunct sports venues in Surrey
English cricket venues in the 18th century
History of Surrey
Local nature reserves in Greater London
Parks and open spaces in the London Borough of Richmond upon Thames
Sport in Surrey
Sports venues completed in 1736